Stefan Morjean (born 17 March 1960) is a Belgian former professional racing cyclist. He rode in four editions of the Tour de France.

References

External links

1960 births
Living people
Belgian male cyclists
People from Zwevegem
Cyclists from West Flanders